St. Johns—Iberville—Napierville was a federal electoral district in Quebec, Canada, that was represented in the House of Commons of Canada from 1935 to 1949.

This riding was created in 1933 from Laprairie—Napierville and St. Johns—Iberville ridings. It was abolished in 1947 when it was replaced by Saint-Jean—Iberville—Napierville riding.

It consisted of: 
 the county of St. Johns excluding the municipality of Notre-Dame du-Mont-Carmel, St-Bernard-de-Lacolle and the village of Lacolle;
 the county of Iberville;
 the county of Napierville.

Members of Parliament

This riding elected the following Members of Parliament:

Election results

See also 

 List of Canadian federal electoral districts
 Past Canadian electoral districts

External links 
 Riding history from the Library of Parliament

Former federal electoral districts of Quebec